The Inside Lacrosse Big City Classic was an annual college lacrosse triple-header event played in East Rutherford, New Jersey from 2009 to 2013. It was held at first at Giants Stadium and then MetLife Stadium, the home fields of the NFL's New York Giants and New York Jets and is sponsored by the Baltimore-based magazine, Inside Lacrosse.

The inaugural edition took place on April 4, 2009 at Giants Stadium, and featured six teams that possessed a combined 67 NCAA tournament semifinals appearances and 24 NCAA championships. One of the participants, Syracuse, was the defending national championship team.

The 2009 Big City Classic set the attendance record for a regular season lacrosse-only event with 22,308 spectators. This exceeded the previous-record 20,130 fans that attended the 2007 Face-Off Classic in Baltimore, and also surpassed the expected crowd of 15,000 to 20,000. In 2008, 29,601 fans attended the Ohio State–Denver lacrosse match, but it also featured a spring football scrimmage, and therefore was not a lacrosse-only event.  The second Big City Classic in 2010 was the inaugural event at MetLife Stadium (then New Meadowlands Stadium) and featured the same six teams and broke last years attendance mark, with 25,710 attending.

There was a shakeup in the lineup for the 2011 classic as only Syracuse and UNC remained in the lineup.  In order to attract a more local audience, the first game featured New Jersey-based Rutgers and St. John's, which is located in New York City.  Johns Hopkins joined the lineup, playing North Carolina, and Duke played in the nightcap against Syracuse.  This change did not greatly affect the attendance, however, as 25,145 arrived for the games.

The 2012 Big City classic once again has a lineup change, as Rutgers will not return to the event, having lost to St. John's 9-8 in the 2011 game.  They will be replaced by Notre Dame, making their Classic debut. The games took place on April 1, 2012.

Results

See also
Face-Off Classic, an NCAA men's lacrosse tournament held annually at the beginning of the season at M&T Bank Stadium in Baltimore, Maryland

References

External links
Big City Classic, official website.
Inside Lacrosse Big City Classic: By the Numbers, Inside Lacrosse, April 4, 2009.
Big City Classic brings big lacrosse, ESPN, April 3, 2009.

College lacrosse competitions in the United States
College lacrosse rivalries in the United States
NCAA lacrosse
Sports competitions in East Rutherford, New Jersey
2009 establishments in New Jersey
2012 disestablishments in New Jersey